This article presents a list of the historical events and publications of Australian literature during 1991.

Events 

 David Malouf won the Miles Franklin Award for The Great World

Major publications

Novels 
 Peter Carey, The Tax Inspector
 Brian Castro, Double-Wolf
 Bryce Courtenay, Tandia
 Robert Drewe, Our Sunshine
 Colleen McCullough, The Grass Crown
 Tim Winton, Cloudstreet

Short story anthologies 
 Suzanne Edgar, Counting Backwards and Other Stories
 Jackie French, Rain Stones (for children)

Children's and young adult fiction 
 Anna Fienberg, The Magnificent Nose and Other Marvels
 Robin Klein, Came Back to Show You I Could Fly
 John Marsden, Letters from the Inside
 Margaret Barbalet, The Wolf

Poetry 
 Alison Croggon, This is the stone
 A. D. Hope, Orpheus
 Jean Kent, Practising Breathing
 John Tranter, The Floor of Heaven

Drama 
 Michael Gow, Furious

Non-fiction 
 Bruce Bennett, Spirit in exile, Peter Porter and his poetry
Barry Hill, Sitting In
 Julie Lewis, Olga Masters, a lot of living
 David Marr, Patrick White: A Life

Awards and honours 

 Robert Hughes , for "service to art and to the promotion of Australian culture"
 Bruce Beaver , for "service to literature, particularly in the field of poetry"
 David Rowbotham , for "service to literature"
 Patricia Scott , for "service to children's literature"

Deaths 
A list, ordered by date of death (and, if the date is either unspecified or repeated, ordered alphabetically by surname) of deaths in 1991 of Australian literary figures, authors of written works or literature-related individuals follows, including year of birth.

 21 February — Dorothy Auchterlonie Green, academic, literary critic and poet (born 1915)
 3 April — Coral Lansbury, writer and academic (born 1929)
 7 April — Bob Brissenden, poet, novelist, critic and academic (born 1928)
 2 May — Ronald McKie, novelist (born 1909)
 23 May — Manning Clark, historian (born 1915)
 24 June — Sumner Locke Elliott, novelist and playwright (born 1917)
 17 November — Pixie O'Harris, children's book author and illustrator (born 1903)
 1 December — Barbara Hanrahan, novelist and artist (born 1939)

See also 

 1991 in Australia
 1991 in literature
 1991 in poetry
 List of years in literature
 List of years in Australian literature

References 

1991 in Australia
Australian literature by year
20th-century Australian literature
1991 in literature